Chequered skipper could refer to any of the following butterfly species:
 Carterocephalus palaemon also known as arctic skipper
 Large chequered skipper, Heteropterus morpheus
 Kedestes lepenula

Animal common name disambiguation pages